Emma Relph is a British actress, best known for her role of Jo in The Day of the Triffids. She trained at the Central School of Speech and Drama. She is the daughter of Michael Relph and half-sister of Simon Relph. She now works as a professional astrologer and counsellor, teaches Kundalini yoga and Curative Astrology, and is a leader of Dances of Universal Peace.

Relph appeared in the music video for "Penthouse and Pavement" by Heaven 17.

Filmography
The Day of the Triffids (1981)
 (1981)
The Professionals (1983)
Chessgame (1983)
Eureka (1984)
 Screen Two: In the Secret State (1985)
Bulman (1985)
The Witches (1990)

References

External links
 

British film actresses
British television actresses
Alumni of the Royal Central School of Speech and Drama
Living people
Year of birth missing (living people)